Lars Lambooij (born 16 April 1988) is a Dutch former professional footballer who played as a midfielder. During his career, he play for Go Ahead Eagles in the Dutch Eredivisie and SC Veendam. He currently works as a scout for RKC Waalwijk.

After his retirement in 2017, he became a scout for Go Ahead Eagles. In June 2020, he moved to RKC Waalwijk, where he would base his scouting on data gathered by the club's video and data analysts.

References

External links
 Voetbal International profile 

1988 births
Living people
Dutch footballers
SC Veendam players
Go Ahead Eagles players
Eredivisie players
Eerste Divisie players
Footballers from Tilburg
Association football midfielders
RKC Waalwijk non-playing staff
Go Ahead Eagles non-playing staff